The 2019–20 Pro50 Championship was the eighteenth edition of the Pro50 Championship, a List A cricket tournament that was played in Zimbabwe. It started on 4 February 2020, with five teams taking part. Mashonaland Eagles were the defending champions.

On 18 March 2020, Zimbabwe Cricket suspended all forms of cricket in the country due to the COVID-19 pandemic. On 4 May 2020, Zimbabwe Cricket voided the tournament due to the pandemic with no winner being declared.

Points table

Fixtures

Round-robin

References

External links
 Series home at ESPN Cricinfo

2020 in Zimbabwean cricket
Pro50 Championship
Pro50 Championship
Pro50 Championship